Lyford, also called Williamson, is an unincorporated community in western Florida Township, Parke County, in the U.S. state of Indiana. The town was formerly the site of Lyford School.

History
Lyford was founded in 1892, and named in honor of W. H. Lyford, a railroad official. A post office was established at Lyford in 1892, and remained in operation until it was discontinued in 1912.

Geography

References

Unincorporated communities in Indiana
Unincorporated communities in Parke County, Indiana